The Uttar Pradesh Legislative Assembly (Hindi: Uttar Pradesh Vidhan Sabha) is the lower house of the bicameral legislature of Uttar Pradesh. There are 403 seats in the house filled by direct election using a single-member first-past-the-post system.

History

List of Assemblies

Eighteenth assembly

Members of Legislative Assembly

See also
Uttar Pradesh Legislature
Uttar Pradesh Legislative Council
First Legislative Assembly of Uttar Pradesh
Eighteenth Uttar Pradesh Assembly
Government of Uttar Pradesh

References

Sources
History of Legislature in Uttar Pradesh

External links
 Official Site of Legislature in Uttar Pradesh
Uttar Pradesh Government website
UP Assembly

 
Uttar Pradesh Legislature
State lower houses in India